Phillip Reginald Witherspoon (born February 21, 1961) is the head coach of the Canisius College men's basketball team and the former head coach of the University at Buffalo men's college basketball team.

Witherspoon played college basketball at Erie Community College under John Beilein and then at Wheeling Jesuit under Jim O'Brien.

He was the head coach at Erie Community College, and head coach and assistant coach at Sweet Home High School before he was hired as the interim head coach at Buffalo in December 1999. Witherspoon was named full-time head coach on March 10, 2000. He was the first African American named head coach of a varsity sports team in any Western New York suburban school district. He was fired after the 2012-13 season, finishing his 14 season run with a 198-228 record. Witherspoon served one season as an assistant at Alabama under head coach Anthony Grant. In 2015, Witherspoon was let go by Alabama when Grant was replaced by Avery Johnson. He was subsequently named as an assistant on Matt McCall's staff at UT-Chattanooga.

In May 2016, Witherspoon was hired to replace the retiring Jim Baron at Canisius College.

Head coaching record

* Hired as interim coach after Tim Cohane resigned after 5 games

References

External links
Canisius Golden Griffins bio

1961 births
Living people
Alabama Crimson Tide men's basketball coaches
American men's basketball coaches
American men's basketball players
Basketball coaches from New York (state)
Basketball players from New York (state)
Buffalo Bulls men's basketball coaches
Canisius Golden Griffins men's basketball coaches
Chattanooga Mocs men's basketball coaches
College men's basketball head coaches in the United States
Erie Kats men's basketball coaches
High school basketball coaches in the United States
Junior college men's basketball players in the United States
Sportspeople from Buffalo, New York
Wheeling Cardinals men's basketball players
Empire State College alumni
SUNY Erie alumni